Aoa is a village on the north-east coast of Tutuila Island, American Samoa. It is located on the north coast, close to the island's eastern tip, at a narrowing of the island and is connected by road with Amouli on the south coast. Aoa is the oldest site on Tutuila to yield ceramics. Located in a large U-shaped valley on the northeast coast of the island, Aoa sits on a wide, sandy beach fronted by a large, deep bay. Fresh water is supplied by a steady river which runs through the village. It is located in Vaifanua County.

Over 40 ancient star mounds have been discovered in the bush near Aoa. Village chiefs believe these elevated stone platforms were used in the ancient chiefly sport of pigeon-snaring. Archeologists believe they served as military lookouts due to their placement at strategic vantage points, perhaps as a military lookout for enemy canoes. Besides the star mounds, lepita pottery has been discovered in Aoa. Some estimates date some of the potshards discovered here to 2000 BCE, while most of the scientific community dates them to 500 BCE. The Department of Tourism operated a camp site here complete with showers and barbecue facilities. The campsite was however closed as of 1994.

It is one of few places in American Samoa with remaining patches of mangrove forest. The largest such forests are found in Nu'uuli and Leone.

Aoa is adjacent to Faalefu, a neighboring village which shares Aoa Bay.

History
In 1942, Austrian immigrant to the U.S., Karl Paul Lippe, was billeted in the village of Aoa. He had joined the U.S. Marine Corps and was sent to the Samoan Islands. In the village of Aoa, Lippe was embraced by High Chief Logo, who asked him to move into his fale. Eventually, Lippe fell in love with Malele, the chief's daughter. At the time the young Marine was called off to war, his wife was pregnant. After World War II, he made an attempt to visit American Samoa, but was told no one was allowed to settle in the islands without the Naval Governor's permission. His request was initially denied but was later accepted when he managed to get in contact with the Chief of Naval Operations in Washington.

Geography
The steep and mountainous terrain of the northern coast separates the villages along this coast from Pago Pago and other Tutuila villages. A narrow and unpaved road (as of 1975) connects Aoa with its neighboring villages.

Demographics

References

Villages in American Samoa